Fairfax Gill (3 September 1883 – 1 November 1917) was an English first-class cricketer, who played two matches for Yorkshire County Cricket Club in 1906.

Born in Wakefield, Yorkshire, England, Gill was a right-handed middle order batsman, who made his debut against Derbyshire at Queen's Park, Chesterfield. He was run out for 1, and bowled by Billy Bestwick for 3, as Yorkshire won a tight game by 33 runs. His second, and final game, came against Nottinghamshire at Trent Bridge. He was bowled by John Gunn for 11 and then, promoted to open the innings, bowled by Albert Hallam for 3 in a drawn match, more notable for twin centuries by David Denton.

Gill also played for the Yorkshire Cricket Council in 1903, and the Yorkshire Second XI in 1906.

Gill died aged 34, in November 1917 at Wimereux, near Boulogne-sur-Mer, France, in World War I.

The Wakefield Express called him "a true sportsman" who was "never carried away by success".[2]

References

   2. http://www.yorkshirepost.co.uk/news/bygones-yorkshire-trio-paid-the-ultimate-sacrifice-serving-king-and-country-1-7023363#ixzz3owf8EvFq

External links
Cricinfo Profile
Cricket Archive Statistics

1883 births
1917 deaths
Yorkshire cricketers
Cricketers from Wakefield
English cricketers
English cricketers of 1890 to 1918
British military personnel killed in World War I